OCB may refer to:

Arts, entertainment, and media
 O.c.b. (album), a 2009 album by O.S.T.R.
 "O.C.B.", a song by Joey Badass from his 2015 album B4.Da.$$
 OCB, a song by Billy Ze Kick et les Gamins en Folie on their 1993 self-titled album
 OCB, a song by Malaa
 OCB, abbreviation of The Oxford Companion to Beer
 Orange Catholic Bible, a fictional book from the Dune universe created by Frank Herbert

Brands and enterprises
 Odet-Cascadec-Bolloré, a brand of cigarette rolling papers manufactured by Republic Tobacco
 Old Country Buffet, American restaurant chain
 Orient Commercial Joint Stock Bank (OCB), a large bank located in Vietnam

Sports
 Óquei Clube de Barcelos, a rink hockey team from Barcelos, Portugal
 Orlando City B, a soccer team in Florida, United States

Other uses
 OCB mode, a mode of operation for cryptographic block ciphers
 Oil circuit breaker, a form of circuit breaker using oil as an insulating medium
 Oligoclonal bands, bands of immunoglobulins that are seen in a patients serum or CSF
 Operations Coordinating Board (1953–1961), a committee of the United States Executive
 Ordinary course of business, a term in law covering the usual transactions, customs and practices of a certain business and of a certain firm
 Organizational citizenship behavior, a special type of work behavior